The Finnish national road 2 (Finnish:Valtatie 2, Swedish:Riksväg 2) is a main route between Vihti and Pori. The road runs from Palojärvi, Vihti to Pori's Mäntyluoto. The road is mainly a typical Finnish road with two driving lanes. National road 2 has a short part of motorway on its starting place and it is only 1 kilometer long and that means it is the shortest motorway in Finland and National road 2 has another bypass in Pori which is about 5 kilometers long.

History

Before National Road 2 got its present line, it ran first from Helsinki to Nummi-Pusula's Saukkola on the same line as an old national road 1 which is now regional road 110. It turned north and ran to the Somero where it joined an old national road 10 in Somero's downtown, then it ran to the Jokioinen on the line of the current main road 52 and then it joined national road 10's present line in Jokioinen. There National road 2 turned to the west and went with National road 10 to the regional road 213's crossroad and turned to the north again. Then it ran on the current regional road 213's line through Ypäjä, Loimaa and Alastaro until it turned to the main road 41's present line in Virttaa. Then national road 2 ran to Huittinen where it faced Its present line where it ran on the same line to Pori where it goes in nowadays between Huittinen and Pori.

National road 2, rebuilt in the 1960s, was constructed only 8 metres wide so it is narrower than almost every other national road in Finland. When it was completed, it was found too dangerous between Helsinki's Ring III and Vihti's Olkkala, so it was rebuilt again between Ring III and Olkkala in the 1970s, new line built from National road 1 and it is little longer but safer line than an old one. An old hilly and complex road between Helsinki and Olkkala was later numbered to the regional road 120. Later the only dangerous part between Olkkala and Karkkila was built to the 2+1 or 1+2 laned road.

Before national road 2 continued to Mäntyluoto, the road between Pori and Mäntyluoto was regional road 265. That part from national road 2 is very straight but slightly narrow and the roads speed limit in that line is 80 km/h.

See also
 Highways in Finland
 Vihdintie
 Åland Islands Highway 2

References

External links

Roads in Finland